Pingtai is a town of Taobei District, Baicheng, in northwestern Jilin province, People's Republic of China, located more than  west of downtown Baicheng. , it has one residential community and 14 villages under its administration.

See also 
 List of township-level divisions of Jilin

References 

Township-level divisions of Jilin